McGinnis Peak is an  elevation glaciated summit located at the head of McGinnis Glacier in the eastern Alaska Range, in Alaska, United States. It is the eighth-highest peak in the Hayes Range, a subset of the Alaska Range. Mount Moffit, the nearest higher neighbor, is set  to the northwest, and Mount Shand is positioned  to the west.

Enormous rockslides fell from McGinnis Peak during the 2002 Denali earthquake, which had an epicenter 35 miles to the west. The slides released a significant volume of deposits.

Climate
Based on the Köppen climate classification, McGinnis Peak is located in a subarctic climate zone with long, cold, snowy winters, and mild summers. This climate supports the Trident, Black Rapids, and McGinnis Glaciers surrounding this peak. Temperatures can drop below −20 °C with wind chill factors below −30 °C. The months May through June offer the most favorable weather for climbing or viewing. Precipitation runoff from the mountain drains into tributaries of the Tanana River drainage basin.

Climbing
All established climbing routes are technical, and include the Northeast Ridge (WI3), The Southeast Ridge, and the Cut-throat Couloir (WI5). The first ascent of this peak was made August 5, 1964, by Larry Muir and Tom Knott via the West Ridge. The second ascent was made June 21, 1976, by John Garson and James Brady via the knife-edge Northeast Ridge.  
The first ascent via the Southeast Ridge was made May 5, 1980 by Walter Palkovitch and Dan Gray. The first ascent via Cut-throat Couloir was made in March 1985 by Roman Dial and Chuck Comstock. The standard descent route is the Northeast Ridge.

See also

List of mountain peaks of Alaska
Geology of Alaska

Gallery

References

External links
 Weather forecast: McGinnis Peak
 McGinnis and Moffit from northeast: Flickr photo

Alaska Range
Landforms of Southeast Fairbanks Census Area, Alaska
Mountains of Alaska
North American 3000 m summits